Netrunner is an out-of-print collectible card game (CCG) designed by Richard Garfield, the creator of Magic: The Gathering. It was published by Wizards of the Coast and introduced in April 1996. The game took place in the setting for the Cyberpunk 2020 role-playing game (RPG), but it also drew from the broader cyberpunk genre.

In 2012, Fantasy Flight Games released Android: Netrunner, a new card game based on Netrunner, under license from Wizards of the Coast. The new game uses Fantasy Flight Games' Living Card Game release format (as used in their Warhammer: Invasion, A Game of Thrones, Call of Cthulhu, and Lord of the Rings games), and shares the cyberpunk setting of their Android board game.

Gameplay 
Netrunner depicts cyberspace combat between a global mega-corporation (the Corp) and a hacker (the Runner). The Corp aims to complete its secret agendas before the Runner can hack in and steal data. It isn't easy, though, as the Corp has strong defensive data forts protected by malevolent computer programs known as ICE (short for Intrusion Countermeasures Electronics). Runners must use special programs of their own, called icebreakers, to break through and steal the hidden plans. All this is paid for in the game by bits (representing currency), which are earned and spent during the course of play.

An interesting feature of Netrunner is its asymmetry: each side has different abilities and uses completely different cards distinguished by alternate card backs. This contrasts with most other CCGs, which usually depict a "battle between peers" where each opponent draws upon the same card pool. While a player does not have to play both sides except in tournament play, many players believe that a firm understanding of both leads to better overall player ability.

The Cyberpunk 2020 supplement Rache Bartmoss' Brainware Blowout featured rules on using Netrunner cards instead of the RPG's existing system to simulate netrunning during game sessions. It also gave conversions to the RPG of some of the cards in the base set (the rest having been mentioned in one book or another).

Expansion sets
 Netrunner base set (aka Limited, v1.0) - 374 cards - Release Date: April 26, 1996. The set was sold in 60-card starter decks and 15-card booster packs.
 Proteus (v2.1) - 154 cards - Release Date: September 1996 The set was sold in 15-card booster packs, and included game mechanics considered too advanced for the base set.
 Silent Impact - Never released, development halted by WotC. However, a series of six cards labelled 'v2.0' were issued as promotional cards for a planned, but never released, Netrunner 2.0 core set. Even though originally appearing in Netrunner 1.0, these six cards have been revised for 2.0 and feature new artwork as well as revised game text. The six cards in question are Forged Activation Orders, misc.for-sale, The Shell Traders, Pacifica Regional AI, Bizarre Encryption Scheme, and New Galveston City Grid. These cards are extremely rare.
 Classic (v2.2) - 52 cards from the Silent Impact set. Release Date: November 1999

Several fan-made expansions have been created for Netrunner and released online. Many of them have been sanctioned for tournament play.

Webrunner
Netrunner launched with a proto-alternate reality game called Webrunner: The Hidden Agenda, which cast players as hackers against the evil Futukora corporation. Players broke through seven puzzle-themed "gates" to get the secret data ("agenda"). The popular game was the first online game tied into a product release, making the front page of The New York Times technology section.

A sequel, Webrunner II: The Forbidden Code, followed on release of the Proteus expansion. In this, players were cast as security chiefs beset by hackers.

Online gameplay
The Android: Netrunner community plays on Jinteki.net, a free and open source web platform with rule implementation.

Netrunner was playable online through CCG Workshop in the past, but it was shut down by Wizards of the Coast. It is now possible to play Netrunner online using Magic Workstation on Runners' Net, a site which also holds IRC chats and forums to discuss the game. Players may also use other CCG engines such as LackeyCCG or Gccg, which allows players to build and share plugins for different card games and play the games online.
This game can now be played on the OCTGN online game system.

Product ownership
Zvi Mowshowitz, a well-known Magic: The Gathering Pro Tour player, attempted to purchase the license for Netrunner from Wizards of the Coast after the company stopped producing the game. Negotiations, however, fell apart without any revival of the game or transfer of ownership.

In 2012, Fantasy Flight Games announced that they were releasing a modified version of Netrunner, under license from Wizards of the Coast, called Android: Netrunner.

In 2018, Fantasy Flight Games announced that their partnership with Wizards of the Coast to license development of the game was concluding. Starting October 22, 2018, Fantasy Flight no longer sells Netrunner products.

In August and September 2021, Wizards of the Coast renewed trademarks for both physical and digital Netrunner goods and content. However, as of February 23, 2022, Wizards of the Coast filed a Notice of Abandonment for the trademark application.

Reception
Andy Butcher reviewed Netrunner for Arcane magazine, rating it a 9 out of 10 overall. Butcher comments that "Netrunner is almost without fault. It's certainly the best new card game in the last year, and arguably the best since Magic started it all. Richard Garfield has done it again."

Netrunner was lauded by critics, such as InQuest magazine, for its balanced game play and impressive artwork. In 1999 Pyramid magazine named Netrunner as one of "The Millennium's Most Underrated Games".  According to editor Scott Haring, "among the connoisseurs of the card game design art, Netrunner is considered to be one of the best-designed games ever."

References

External links
 Top Runners' Conference - The Official Netrunner Player Organization
 The Netrunner Weekly - Online magazine
 The Short Circuit
 Runners' Net - Play NetRunner online with MWS and discuss about the game.
 
 Fantasy Flight Games (Android: Netrunner The Card Game) - Android: Netrunner Official Website

Further reading

Card games introduced in 1996
Collectible card games
Cyberpunk games
Virtual reality in fiction
Richard Garfield games
Wizards of the Coast games